Sonia Rosemary Cubitt,  (née Keppel, previously The Hon. Mrs. Cubitt; 24 May 1900 – 16 August 1986) was a British socialite, author and aristocrat. She was the first wife of Roland Cubitt, 3rd Baron Ashcombe and through her only daughter Rosalind, was the maternal grandmother of Queen Camilla. She is also known as the daughter of Alice Keppel, a mistress of King Edward VII.

Childhood
Sonia Rosemary Keppel was born on 24 May 1900, as the youngest child of the Hon. George Keppel (1865-1947) and  Alice Frederica Keppel (née Edmonstone) (1868-1947), youngest child of Sir William Edmonstone, 4th Baronet. Her father George was the youngest son of William Keppel, 7th Earl of Albemarle and his wife Sophia Mary Keppel (née MacNab), while her mother Alice was a British society hostess and a long-time royal mistress of King Edward VII
Her only sibling was the English writer and socialite Violet Trefusis (née Keppel).

Marriage and children
Sonia met her future husband the Hon. Roland Calvert Cubitt at the end of the First World War, shortly after the signing of the armistice in November 1918. Sonia was eighteen, Roland was nearing twenty and a young officer in the Coldstream Guards. Roland belonged to a family of heroes. He was the fourth of the six sons of Henry Cubitt, 2nd Baron Ashcombe. All three of his older brothers were killed in action during the First World War. Roland was heir to Ashcombe Barony  and to a fortune established by his great-grandfather Victorian builder Thomas Cubitt (1788-1855).
On 16 November 1920, Sonia and Roland married at the Guards Chapel of Wellington Barracks in London.

They had three children:

Rosalind Maud Cubitt (1921–1994) m. Major Bruce Middleton Hope Shand and had three children:
 Camilla Rosemary Shand (b. 17 July 1947), later The Queen Consort
 Sonia Annabel Shand (b. 2 February 1949)
 Mark Roland Shand (28 June 1951 – 23 April 2014)
 Henry Edward Cubitt (1924–2013) (who succeeded as the 4th Baron Ashcombe on the death of his father) m. Ghislaine Alexander (née Dresselhuys, ex-wife of Denis Alexander, 6th Earl of Caledon later The Baroness Foley)
 m. Virginia Carington (daughter of Peter Carington, 6th Baron Carrington)
 m. Mary Elizabeth Dent-Brocklehurst (née Chipps) (widow of late Mark Dent-Brocklehurst)
Jeremy John Cubitt (1927–1958) m. Diana Edith Du Cane and had a child:
 Sarah Victoria Cubitt (b. 1953)

The Couple divorced on 4 July 1947, just few months before Roland succeeded as the 3rd Baron Ashcombe. Hence Sonia was never styled Baroness Ashcombe. During her marriage She was styled The Hon. Mrs. Cubitt.

Career 
Sonia like her sister Violet was fond of writing. She wrote the books Three brothers at Havana, 1762 and The Sovereign Lady: A Life of Elizabeth Vassall, Third Lady Holland, with Her Family. 
She was appointed Officer, Order of the British Empire (O.B.E.) in 1959.

Death
Sonia died on 16 August 1986 aged 86, having long suffered from osteoporosis. Eight years later, in 1994 her only daughter Rosalind died from the same disease. She was survived by her daughter Rosalind, eldest Son Henry and four grandchildren. Her youngest son Jeremy predeceased her, dying tragically in 1958.
Her granddaughter  Camilla became a member of the National Osteoporosis Society (a charity dedicated to improving the diagnosis, prevention and treatment of osteoporosis) in 1994 to help raise awareness of the disease, became Patron of the charity in 1997 and was appointed its President in 2001.

Memoir
In 1958, Sonia wrote her memoir entitled The Edwardian daughter, in which she described what her childhood was like in the high-society of the Edwardian era. The memoir was dedicated to her daughter Rosalind.

References

Books cited

1900 births
1986 deaths
Sonia
Sonia
|Sonia
People from Hampshire